Mier Municipality is one of the municipalities of Tamaulipas, Mexico. The seat is at Ciudad Mier. According to the 2010 census, the entire population of the municipality resides in the municipal seat, as both have an official count of 4,762 inhabitants. There were 172 localities enumerated during the census, and all but Mier showed a population of zero.

Adjacent municipalities and counties
 Miguel Alemán Municipality - southeast
 Los Aldamas Municipality, Nuevo León - south
 General Treviño Municipality, Nuevo León - south
 Agualeguas Municipality, Nuevo León - west
 Parás Municipality, Nuevo León - west
 Guerrero Municipality - northwest
 Starr County, Texas - east

References

Municipalities of Tamaulipas